Crassula glomerata is a herb in the family Crassulaceae.

It blooms between August and November producing white-red flowers.

It has become naturalised in Western Australia where it is found on coastal dunes and plains along the coast in the Great Southern, Wheatbelt, South West and Peel regions.

References

glomerata
Plants described in 1767
Flora of Western Australia
Saxifragales of Australia
Taxa named by Peter Jonas Bergius